Bobby Moseley (born 7 March 1996) is an Irish footballer who is retired and now owner of football agency Complete Sports Group.

Career
Moseley began his career playing in the youth teams at Coventry City and then Birmingham City. In July 2015, Moseley joined Stoke City and played in a pre-season friendly against Porto on 2 August 2015. In March 2016, Moseley joined United Soccer League side San Antonio FC on loan. He was released by Stoke at the end of the 2015–16 season.

In July 2016, Moseley signed for National League side Solihull Moors. His stay at Solihull was brief as he joined Southport on a short term contract on 12 September 2016. He joined Gloucester City on 4 February 2017.

International career
Moseley has featured in 25 matches at Republic Of Ireland youth level. Appearing in both the U17 and U19 UEFA European Championships.

References

External links

1996 births
Living people
Republic of Ireland association footballers
Republic of Ireland youth international footballers
Association football defenders
Coventry City F.C. players
Birmingham City F.C. players
Stoke City F.C. players
San Antonio FC players
Solihull Moors F.C. players
Southport F.C. players
Gloucester City A.F.C. players
USL Championship players
National League (English football) players